Puig de la Collada Verda is a mountain of France. It has an elevation of 2,403 metres above sea level.

See also
Mountains of Catalonia

Mountains of Catalonia